A Bump Along the Way is a 2019 Northern Irish comedy-drama film directed by Shelly Love.

Synopsis
A heavy-drinking Derry single mother becomes pregnant at the age of 44 from a one-night stand, much to the mortification of her teenage daughter.

Cast 
 Bronagh Gallagher as Pamela
 Lola Petticrew as Allegra 
 Mary Moulds as Sinead
 Dan Gordon as Michael
Zara Devlin as Rhiannon Coyle
 Gerard Jordan as Kieran

Production
A Bump Along the Way was developed through Northern Ireland Screen's New Talent Focus scheme and Lottery funding via the Arts Council of Northern Ireland.

Release and reception
A Bump Along the Way premiered at the 2019 Belfast Film Festival, then went on general release in October 2019.

The Guardian gave it three stars out of five, saying "The movie has a few awkward narrative transitions and a few EastEnders-ish running-out-of-the-room-crying scene endings, but the overall mood is persuasive and heartfelt and Bronagh Gallagher is a great lead." Variety said that it was "sometimes genuinely perceptive and sometimes pat, with superb leads as its consistent anchor."

Awards
A Bump Along the Way was nominated for Best Film (2020) at the 16th Irish Film & Television Awards, while Bronagh Gallagher was nominated for Best Actress (Film).

Shelly Love, Tess McGowan and Louise Gallagher were nominated for the Discovery Award at the British Independent Film Awards 2019.

References

External links 
 

2019 films
2019 comedy-drama films
Films set in Northern Ireland
Northern Irish films
2010s pregnancy films
2010s English-language films